Nemours–Saint-Pierre is a railway station in Nemours and Saint-Pierre-lès-Nemours, Île-de-France, France. The station opened in 1862 and is located on the Moret–Lyon railway. The station is served by Intercités (long-distance trains) and by Transilien line R (Paris-Gare de Lyon) operated by SNCF. The station building was destroyed in 1870 after a Prussian attack, but the building was not rebuilt until 1881.

Train services

The station is served by Intercités (long distance) services operated by SNCF between Paris and Nevers, and by Transilien line R (from Paris-Gare de Lyon).

Gallery

See also
Transilien Paris–Lyon

References

External links

 
 

Railway stations in Seine-et-Marne
Railway stations in France opened in 1862